Philip Dorsheimer (April 15, 1797 – April 11, 1868) was a German born American politician.

Early life
Dorsheimer was born on April 15, 1797 in Wöllstein, then in the Mont-Tonnerre Department, which is now in Rhineland-Palatinate, Germany.

Career
He came to the United States in 1815, and settled in Harrisburg, Pennsylvania.  In 1826, he moved to Lyons, N.Y., and in April 1836 to Buffalo, New York.  He owned a hotel in Buffalo and became very wealthy.

In 1838, he was appointed Postmaster of Buffalo by President Martin Van Buren. On April 1, 1845, he was appointed again Postmaster of Buffalo by President James K. Polk. Following his appointment, George W. Clinton wrote to President Polk on April 9, 1845 indicating that there were reports that the people of Buffalo reacted unfavorably to Dorsheimer's appointment as postmaster.

He had been always a Democrat, but joined the Republican Party upon its foundation. He was a delegate to the 1856 Republican National Convention.  He was New York State Treasurer from 1860 to 1861.  While treasurer, he hosted first lady-elect, Mary Todd Lincoln, in a suite at the Astor House while she was visiting New York.  During the U.S. Civil War, as Treasurer, Dorsheimer, along with Governor Edwin D. Morgan, awarded the clothing firm of Brooks Brothers the contract for the manufacture of 12,000 Union army uniforms.  From 1862 to 1864, he was Inland Tax Collector at Buffalo.

Personal life
On August 23, 1821, he was married Sarah Gorgas (1802–1867). She was the daughter of Jacob Gorgas and Christina Maria (née Mack) Gorgas.  Together, they were the parents of:

 Elizabeth Dorsheimer (1828–1915), who married Henry Clifton (1820-1877).
 William Dorsheimer (1832–1888), who served as Lieutenant Governor of New York.
 Charles Dorsheimer (b. 1834)

Dorsheimer died on April 11, 1868.  He was buried at Forest Lawn Cemetery in Buffalo.

References

Sources
 Bios of German-Americans in Buffalo, with photo (giving as birthplace "Weistein", a misspelling of "Wollstein")
 Political Graveyard
 Dorsheimer genealogy (giving as birthplace "Dondersberg" - a variant spelling of Donnersberg, translated to Mont-Tonnerre in French, "Canton Wollstein" - cantons are the divisions of the départements)

External links
 

1797 births
1868 deaths
New York State Treasurers
Politicians from Buffalo, New York
German emigrants to the United States
People from Lyons, New York
Politicians from Harrisburg, Pennsylvania
New York (state) postmasters
19th-century American politicians
New York (state) Democrats
New York (state) Republicans